is a Japanese football player for FC Imabari.

Career

FC Imabari
On 5 January 2019, Uehara joined FC Imabari.

Club statistics
Updated to 23 February 2020.

References

External links

Profile at Roasso Kumamoto
Profile at FC Imabari

1991 births
Living people
Hokkaido University of Education alumni
Association football people from Hokkaido
Japanese footballers
J2 League players
J3 League players
Japan Football League players
Hokkaido Consadole Sapporo players
Roasso Kumamoto players
FC Imabari players
Association football midfielders
Sportspeople from Sapporo